Renato Cipollini (August 27, 1945 in Codogno, Province of Lodi – March 12, 2019 in Ferrara) was an Italian professional football player. Following his active career, Cipollini acted as president for Bologna during three years, in a time where the club was at its most successful for 25 years, especially when almost qualifying for the Champions League, only missing out with three points in 2001–02.

Honours
 Serie A champion: 1979/80.
 Coppa Italia winner: 1977/78.

1945 births
2019 deaths
People from Codogno
Italian footballers
Serie A players
Serie B players
Empoli F.C. players
S.P.A.L. players
Brescia Calcio players
Como 1907 players
Atalanta B.C. players
Inter Milan players
Association football goalkeepers
Footballers from Lombardy
Sportspeople from the Province of Lodi